The Stealey–Goff–Vance House, also known as the Amy Roberts Vance House, is a historic home located at Clarksburg, Harrison County, West Virginia.  It was originally built about 1807, and is a gable roofed two-story brick dwelling. It sits on a high coursed rubble foundation.  The house was remodeled about 1891, with the addition of Victorian embellishment.  These modifications include the front gable, porch, and ornate cornice millwork.  The house was purchased in 1933 by Amy Roberts Vance, mother of Cyrus Vance.  In 1967, the property was sold to the Harrison County Historical Society.

It was listed on the National Register of Historic Places in 1979.

References

External links
Harrison County Historical Society website

Houses on the National Register of Historic Places in West Virginia
Houses completed in 1807
Houses in Harrison County, West Virginia
National Register of Historic Places in Harrison County, West Virginia
Victorian architecture in West Virginia
Buildings and structures in Clarksburg, West Virginia
Museums in Harrison County, West Virginia